The Frog Fire was a fatal fire that occurred during the 2015 California wildfire season that burned  of land in the Modoc National Forest. The fire was one of many fires that was started on July 30 during a lightning storm.

Fatality
On July 31, a United States Forest Service member from South Dakota died of carbon monoxide poisoning while battling the fire. David Ruhl, a captain with South Dakota's Black Hills National Forest, had vanished the night before.

References

2015 California wildfires
Modoc National Forest
Wildfires in Lassen County, California